Katakwi is a town in the Eastern Region of Uganda. It is the main municipal, administrative, and commercial center of Katakwi District and the site of the district headquarters.

Location
The coordinates of the town are 01°54'54.0"N, 33°57'18.0"E (Latitude:1.9150; Longitude:33.9550).

Population
The 2002 national census estimated the town's population at 5,900. In 2010, the Uganda Bureau of Statistics (UBOS) estimated the population at 8,100. In 2011, UBOS estimated the population  at 8,400 people.

In 2015 the population of the town was projected at 8,000. In 2020 the mid-year population of Katakwi Town Council was projected at 9,100. It was calculated that the population of the town increased at an average annual rate of 2.6 percent between 2015 nd 2020.

Points of interest
The following additional points of interest lie within the town limits or close to the edges of town: (1) Stanbic Bank Uganda Limited maintains a branch in town (2) the offices of Katakwi Town Council (3) Katakwi central market (4) Katakwi General Hospital, a public hospital administered by the Uganda Ministry of Health (5) the Soroti–Katakwi–Moroto–Lokitanyala Road passes through the middle of town.

See also
Teso language
List of cities and towns in Uganda

References

External links
 Katakwi Town Council Lacks Money to Develop

Katakwi District
Teso sub-region
Populated places in Eastern Region, Uganda